"Whiplash" is a song by American heavy metal band Metallica. It was released as the first single from their debut album, Kill 'Em All, and the band's debut single overall, released on August 8, 1983. The song has been covered a number of times, most notably by Motörhead, whose version won a Grammy Award for Best Metal Performance. 

The single also includes fake live performances of "Seek & Destroy" and "Phantom Lord", which are actually alternate studio recordings with overdubbed crowd noise.

Live performances 
"Whiplash" was first played live in October 23, 1982, and was one of the last songs Metallica wrote for Kill 'Em All. As of 2022 the song has been played 953 times.

Cover versions and appearances in media
 Motörhead (who have been cited by Metallica as a major influence) covered this song for the Metallica tribute album Metallic Attack: The Ultimate Tribute and won their first Grammy in the awards of 2005 in the Best Metal Performance.
 "Whiplash" was covered by Crematorium on the album Overload: A Tribute to Metallica.
 It was also covered by Billy Milano, Scott Ian, Philip Soussan, and Vinny Appice for Metallic Assault: A Tribute to Metallica.
 Pantera, using the joke name "Pantallica", performed the song live along with "Seek & Destroy" with Jason Newsted on bass, and members Dimebag Darrell (guitar) and Philip Anselmo (vocals) switching roles.
 Destruction covered this song for a Metallica tribute album, and released it on some editions of their album All Hell Breaks Loose as a hidden bonus track.
 Stone Gods covered the song on their Knight of the Living Dead tour.
 "Whiplash" appears in the soundtrack for the video game Tony Hawk's Underground 2.
 "Whiplash" is a playable song in Guitar Hero: Metallica.
 The song can be heard during a fight scene in the 2012 comedy film That's My Boy - starring Adam Sandler and Andy Samberg.
 According to Metallica guitarist Kirk Hammett in an interview, "Whiplash" was the favorite Metallica song of the late Nirvana lead singer Kurt Cobain.

Track listing
US single (vinyl)

US single (cassette maxi-single)

Personnel 
 James Hetfield - vocals, rhythm guitar
 Kirk Hammett - lead guitar
 Lars Ulrich - drums
 Cliff Burton - bass guitar

References

External links
 Whiplash lyrics from the official website

1984 debut singles
Grammy Award for Best Metal Performance
Metallica songs
Songs written by James Hetfield
Songs written by Lars Ulrich
1983 songs
Megaforce Records singles